The Perfect Family is a 2011 comedy-drama film directed by Anne Renton and starring  Kathleen Turner, Emily Deschanel, Jason Ritter, Michael McGrady, Shannon Cochran, Sharon Lawrence, Angelique Cabral, Richard Chamberlain, and Elizabeth Peña

Plot
The film tells the story of a devoutly Catholic wife and mother Eileen (Kathleen Turner) who has been nominated for one of the church's top awards. She then goes about trying to prove she has the "perfect" family, refusing to accept them for who they are, especially her lesbian daughter Shannon who marries her girlfriend Angela.

At the award luncheon Eileen is only with her sister but in the end her whole family comes to support her.

Cast
 Kathleen Turner as Eileen Cleary - Mother - Catholic Woman of the Year nominee
 Emily Deschanel as Shannon Cleary - Gay pregnant attorney daughter
 Jason Ritter as Frank Cleary Jr. - Fireman divorcing son
 Michael McGrady as Frank Cleary - Fireman father in AA wants separation
 Shannon Cochran as Mary Donovan - Mother's sister
 Sharon Lawrence as Agnes Dunn - Other nominee
 Angelique Cabral as Angela Rayes - Shannon's fiancée/wife
 Richard Chamberlain as Monsignor Murphy
 Elizabeth Peña as Christina Rayes - Angela's mother
 Gregory Zaragoza as Louis Reyes - Angela's father
 Kristen Dalton as Theresa Henessy - Frank Jr.'s girlfriend
 Laura Cerón as Carmelita - Church lady cook
 Scott Michael Campbell as Father Joe MacDonald
 Hansford Rowe as Archbishop of Dublin Father Donnelly
 Rebecca Wackler as Sister Joan
 June Squibb as Mrs. Punch
 Bess Meisler as Greta Russert
 Mandy June Turpin as Susan O'Connor

References

External links
 
 
 
 
 
 

2011 films
American LGBT-related films
Lesbian-related films
Same-sex marriage in film
2011 LGBT-related films
2010s English-language films
2010s American films